Coen Airport  is an airport located  northwest of Coen, Queensland, Australia.

See also
 List of airports in Queensland

References

Airports in Queensland